Grimley is a village and civil parish in the Malvern Hills District in  the county of Worcestershire, England about  north of Worcester.

It is known for the Norman Parish Church; St Bartholomew. A la Carte Restaurant; Wagon Wheel. A 16th-century Inn; The Camp House Inn. Bevere Lock. Primary School. Grimley Gravel Pits (or -Pools), a gravel quarry and nature reserve SSSI.

The villages of Sinton Green and Monkwood Green sit within Grimley Parish.

History

The place-name 'Grimley' is first attested in a Saxon charter of 851, where it appears as Grimanlea. In the Domesday Book of 1086 it appears as Grimanleh. The name means 'wood haunted by a ghost or spectre' (Old English grima).

It once housed a monastery which was reputedly linked to Holt Castle via tunnels, and has been a site of refuge for thousands of years.

Following the Poor Law Amendment Act 1834, Grimley Parish ceased to be responsible for maintaining the poor in its parish. This responsibility was transferred to Martley Poor Law Union.

References

Nearby
Holt

Grimley in fiction 
Although the film Brassed off is located in Grimley, the real band was located in Grimethorpe.

External links

A walk around Grimley
St. Bartholomew's Church
List of Rectors, 1269-1988

Villages in Worcestershire
Nature reserves in Worcestershire
Civil parishes in Worcestershire